Bülent Keneş is a Turkish journalist, currently living in exile in Sweden and working with the Stockholm Center for Freedom. He previously served as editor-in-chief of Today's Zaman.

Biography 
Keneş earned a bachelor's degree in international relations from Boğaziçi University and a PhD from Marmara University. From 2005 to 2006, he served as editor-in-chief of Bugün. In 2007, he joined Today's Zaman as the newly-founded English-language newspaper's first editor-in-chief.

In July 2014, Turkish Prime Minister Recep Tayyip Erdoğan filed a legal complaint against Keneş with the Ankara Chief Public Prosecutor's Office, alleging that Keneş had targeted him with a smear campaign. 

On 9 October 2015, Keneş was arrested by Turkish police on charges of insulting Erdoğan, now President of Turkey, on Twitter. The Committee to Protect Journalists condemned the arrest as part of a "relentless crackdown on the press" in Turkey.

Following the 2016 Turkish coup d'état attempt, a further arrest warrant was issued by Turkish authorities, targeting him and 46 other Zaman employees.

Following Sweden's application for NATO membership in 2022, the Turkish government demanded the extradition of several dozen individuals living in Sweden, including Keneş. In December 2022, the Supreme Court of Sweden blocked the extradition of Keneş, ruling that several of the Turkish charges against him were not crimes under Swedish law and that there was "a risk of persecution based on this person’s political beliefs."

See also 
 Censorship in Turkey
 Human rights in Turkey

References 

21st-century Turkish journalists
Turkish exiles
Sweden–NATO relations
Gülen movement
Living people
Year of birth missing (living people)
Turkish expatriates in Sweden